Suzie Pierrepont (born 3 January 1985 in Stoke-on-Trent, Staffordshire, England), is a professional squash player who represented England as a junior. She reached a career-high world ranking of World No. 25 in August 2009.

Professional career
2008 WSA Macau Open winner

2016 Women's World Doubles Gold Medalist

2016 Mixed World Doubles Bronze Medalist .

References

External links

English female squash players
Living people
1985 births
Sportspeople from Stoke-on-Trent